'''LTS Lufttransport Süd AG, usually shortended to LTS and later branded as LTU Süd''', was an German leisure airline headquartered and based in Munich, operating scheduled and charter flights to European and long-haul leisure destinations. It operated from May 1984 until it merged with its parent company, the larger LTU, in 1998.

History

LTS
Parent company LTU from Düsseldorf, an already well-established leisure carrier, opened the subsidiary Lufttransport Süd AG & Co KG Fluggesellschaft (LTS) in August 1983. LTS started with three Boeing 757s, which were soon transferred to yet another subsidiary, LTE based out of Palma de Mallorca. 

The subsidiaries were established in order to operate more cost efficient flights out of Munich with lower wage, newly hired employees. LTU mainline crews worked under very expensive labor contracts that could not be restructured unilaterally by the company. LTS was a way to circumvent high labor costs by having its employees fly with completely different contracts than those already held by employees of LTU in Düsseldorf. Another reason for operating separate airlines under one parent company was the fact that German law did not permit flight attendants to operate on more than two different types of aircraft families. During fleet transition periods, however, airlines are allowed to have flight attendants qualified on up to three aircraft. At the time LTS was opened, LTU already operated Lockheed L-1011 and McDonnell-Douglas MD-11 aircraft.

LTU Süd
In 1988, LTS was rebranded to LTU Süd, also receiving a new corporate design to closer resemble its well-known parent company LTU.

LTU intended for LTU Süd to serve European, African and Southeast Asian destinations out of Munich with Boeing 757 aircraft. After the 1988 recertification of ETOPS to be allowed to fly overwater for more than 180 minutes, LTU Süd acquired additonal larger Boeing 767 aircraft in 1989 to fly across the Atlantic and the Far East. For the purpose of operating transatlantic flights out of Düsseldorf with the 767, LTU opened an additional crew base for LTU Süd at Düsseldorf Airport. All LTU Süd flights were marketed as LTU flights. 

LTU Süd was dissolved and fully merged into its parent company LTU in 1998. LTU itself was then absorbed into Air Berlin nearly 10 years later, in 2007.

Fleet
During its existence, LTS operated the following aircraft:
13 Boeing 757-200
4 Boeing 767-300ER

References

External links

Airlines established in 1983
Airlines disestablished in 1998
Defunct airlines of Germany